Bade Miyan Chote Miyan is a 1998 Indian Hindi-language action comedy film directed by David Dhawan. Produced by Vashu Bhagnani's Pooja Entertainment, the film stars an ensemble cast with Govinda and Amitabh Bachchan playing dual roles as a police officer and thief each while also featuring actors like Raveena Tandon, Ramya Krishnan, Anupam Kher, Paresh Rawal, Sharat Saxena and Satish Kaushik with Madhuri Dixit in a special appearance. It was inspired from Hollywood movie Bad Boys (1995) starring Will Smith.

Budgeted at 8.9 crore, Bade Miyan Chote Miyan was theatrically released worldwide on 16 October 1998 and emerged as a major commercial success with a total gross collection of 35.21 crore, despite clashing with Karan Johar's Kuch Kuch Hota Hai which also saw Kher in an important role. Also, it was one of the highest grossing Hindi films of 1998. It was the first Hindi film to be shot in the Ramoji Film City.

In February 2022, Bhagnani announced his new production, an action comedy film also titled Bade Miyan Chote Miyan starring Akshay Kumar and Tiger Shroff, directed by Ali Abbas Zafar and set to release on Christmas 2023.

Plot 

Police inspectors Arjun Singh and Pyare Mohan Bhargava share a friendly bond. Arjun is unmarried and some petty comments are made about his age. His sister Seema is dating Pyare. Zorawar Siddiqui, a business smuggler of diamonds and arms, works under the cover of being a statue maker. In a hotel, he discovers he is being spied upon; he gets rid of Madhu, an eyewitness. Her friend, Neha sees her murder. She calls the police, and Arjun comes there. He takes her to Pyare's house.

Two petty thieves Bade Miyan and Chote Miyan who are look-alikes of Arjun and Pyare, arrive in town. Confusion ensues when every crime the crooks commit are blamed on Arjun and Pyare. Things go further downhill when Shyamlal, the police commissioner is also thrashed by the doubles. Even Seema and Neha mistake Bade and Chote for Arjun and Pyare.
Arjun and Pyare land in trouble when Zorawar kidnaps Seema. They are arrested but get saved by the arrival of Bade and Chote.

Bade and Chote confess their acts of theft and conning and promise to get Seema back. They arrive at Zorawar's hideout and stall them while Arjun and Pyare come with the police force and everyone at the hideout is arrested. The crooks leave after apologising to Seema for the confusion. However some of Zorawar's men hijack the police van which is taking him and his associates to jail. They are stopped by Bade and Chote, asking for a lift. Chote realises the truth and gets Zorawar and his men arrested.

Arjun and Pyare are criticised for their mistake regarding the hijacking of the van and the two crooks are given a job in the police force by Shyamlal. Arjun and Pyare end up being demoted to the post of traffic police officers; Bade and Chote take their place as police inspectors.

Cast 
Amitabh Bachchan as Vijay Nigam (Bade Miyan) / Inspector Arjun Singh
Govinda as Sunil Nigam (Chote Miyan) / Inspector Pyare Mohan Bhargava
Raveena Tandon as Seema Singh
Ramya Krishnan as Neha Ahuja
Anupam Kher as Police Commissioner Shyamlal Tripathi
Paresh Rawal as Zorawar Raaz Ali
Sharat Saxena as Suryadhar Malik
Mahavir Shah as Amrish Chawla
Kader Khan as Waiter Tajendra Chaturvedi/Kadar bhai
Satish Kaushik as Sharafat Ali
Sushma Seth as Vaijanti Singh
Divya Dutta as Madhu Sabharwal
Rakesh Bedi as Watchman
Asrani as Museum Security Officer
Avtar Gill as Sundar Kala
Razzak Khan as Prisoner Khaleem
Tiku Talsania as Jeweller
Shehzad Khan as Inspector, who recorded Zorawar's meeting
David Dhawan as himself
Viju Khote as Passenger
Manmauji as Passenger
Madhuri Dixit as herself

Music 

The music album of the film, composed by Viju Shah with lyrics by Sameer, released on 25th August 1998. Similar to Shah's prior compositions for films like Mohra and Gupt that became quite popular, the album noticeably showed his offbeat mode of music yielding the tuneful numbers like the Hit title track "Bade Miyan Chote Miyan", the Hit zippy bhangra number "Makhna" and the groovy "Kisi Disco Mein Jaaye". Singers Udit Narayan, Sudesh Bhosle, Amit Kumar, Alka Yagnik, Jaspinder Narula, Anuradha Paudwal and Kavita Krishnamurthy allied and rendered their voices for the songs listed below:

Awards 

Zee Cine Awards 1999

Winner

 Zee Cine Award for Best Actor in a Comic Role – Govinda
 44th Filmfare Awards:

Nominated

 Best Actor – Govinda
 Best Music Director – Viju Shah

See also 

 List of buddy cop films worldwide

References

External links 
 

1990s Hindi-language films
1998 films
Films directed by David Dhawan
Films scored by Viju Shah
Indian action comedy films
Buddy cop films 
Indian buddy films